Glasgow Cathcart is a constituency of the Scottish Parliament (Holyrood), being one of eight constituencies within the Glasgow City council area. It elects one Member of the Scottish Parliament (MSP) by the plurality (first past the post) method of election. It is also one of nine constituencies in the Glasgow electoral region, which elects seven additional members, in addition to nine constituency MSPs, to produce a form of proportional representation for the region as a whole.

The seat has been held by James Dornan of the Scottish National Party since the 2011 Scottish Parliament election.

Electoral region 

The other eight constituencies of the Glasgow region are Glasgow Anniesland, Glasgow Kelvin, Glasgow Maryhill and Springburn, Glasgow Pollok, Glasgow Provan, Glasgow Shettleston, Glasgow Southside, and Rutherglen.

The region covers the Glasgow City council area and a north-western portion of the South Lanarkshire council area.

Constituency boundaries 

The current Glasgow Cathcart constituency was created at the same time as the Scottish Parliament, in 1999, with the name and boundaries of an  existing Westminster constituency. In 2005, however, Scottish Westminster (House of Commons) constituencies were mostly replaced with new constituencies.

Boundary review

Following the First Periodic review into Scottish Parliament boundaries, a newly redrawn Cathcart was in place for the Scottish Parliament election, 2011. The electoral wards used in this creation are:
Linn, Newlands/Auldburn, Langside

Member of the Scottish Parliament

Election results

2020s

2010s

2000s

1990s

See also
 Politics of Glasgow

Notes

External links

Constituencies of the Scottish Parliament
Politics of Glasgow
Scottish Parliament constituencies and regions from 2011
1999 establishments in Scotland
Constituencies established in 1999
Scottish Parliament constituencies and regions 1999–2011
Pollokshaws